The 2014–15 season was the 135th season of competitive football by Rangers.

Overview

Rangers played a total of 54 competitive matches during the 2014–15 season.

Rangers boardroom politics were a fictitious force causing a constant flux with change after change of various directorial positions, rival factions attempting to take control of the company and the emergence of Mike Ashley as the major stakeholder and power broker in late 2014. That summer saw continued discontent with various fans groups, alongside Dave King, attempting to influence the board by withdrawing season ticket money. This resulted in a drop of around 15,000 season tickets from the previous season, leaving the club requiring a financial injection which the board hoped would come from a share issue and announced this in June. However, the initial intention of raising up to £10m through an investment plan by the end of August failed when city investors did not purchase enough shares, therefore, the club relaunched a £4m issue open to all existing shareholders only.

Rangers fan discontent was demonstrated during a Championship game against Queen of the South at Ibrox, with fans holding up red cards in the 18th and 72nd minutes, and this was not improved when, on 3 September, it was revealed that Mike Ashley bought the naming rights to Ibrox Stadium for just £1 in a deal with Charles Green in 2012. Concurrently, Rangers former commercial director Imran Ahmad finally succeeded in a bid to have £620,000 of club assets frozen prior to pursuing litigation over an alleged unpaid £500,000 bonus. A few days later the club were granted leave to appeal this decision yet, on 12 September, the club agreed a settlement with Ahmad much to the dismay of fans. As some Rangers supporters groups considered boycotting home matches in protest at the board, it was revealed that Ashley would not be participating in the share offer. Ashley's motivates for not investing became clear in the following month, namely withholding much needed money from the club in order to undermine the board. At the end of the share issue, on 12 September, it was announced that it had raised just over £3m which still £1m short of its minimum target. As the share issue was undertaken in order to allow Rangers to continue to operate into the new year but the failure to reach the targets meant that further funding was required. A few days later, it came to light that Sandy Easdale had met with several investors that had been introduced to him by Rafat Rizvi, a convicted fraudster wanted by Interpol, which led to calls by the Union of Fans for Easdale to resign. However, in a move to demonstrate his strength, Easdale increased his personal shareholding at Rangers to 5.21% on 24 September. On the same day as the club repaid the £1.5m loan to Sandy Easdale and George Letham. The next day, BNP Paribas bought a 5% stake in Rangers making it the fifth-highest shareholder but less than twenty-fours later it was revealed that the transaction was completed on Ashley's behalf thus increasing his stake to 8.92%. Less than a week later, Ashley's holding company, MASH Holdings, called for an EGM to remove chief executive Wallace. This signaled the start of a crucial stage in the boardroom power struggle at Rangers with King appearing to be outflanked by Ashley, who had secured the support of Sandy Easdale, David Sommers as well as the largest shareholder in Rangers, Laxey Partners.

When offers of funding from Dave King, a £16m package, and Brian Kennedy were rejected by Rangers’ hierarchy, who instead opted Mike Ashley's £2m loan offer, it was clear who was victorious. Particularly as Ashley's initial offer was insufficient and he had to be provide another £1m of funding less than a month later. In exchange for the initial funding, Ashley was granted critical power at the club with the privilege to put forward the names of two nominees for appointment to the board as well as security over Edmiston House and the Albion car park. As a consequence of his power grab both Philip Nash and Graham Wallace were forced out of the club and Derek Llambias and Barry Leach were brought in, initially as consultants before being appointed Chief executive  and Finance director respectively. Also David Somers was named executive chairman but on a temporary basis in order to aid the transition. Financial respite was short lived as Rangers announced its preliminary results at the end of November indicating the club required another £8m of investment to see out the season. This effectively left Rangers at the mercy of Ashley who could dictate the terms of and source of any future funding. Due to this power, the Scottish Football Association issued Ashley with a notice of complaint for breached a joint agreement that Ashley would not play a controlling role in Rangers and would maintain a stake of no more than 10%. As Ashley had previously loaned the club £2m and a further £1m as well as having two directors on the Rangers board and a significant interest in Rangers retail operations, although, he did return the naming rights to Ibrox Stadium to Rangers. On Christmas Eve, the SFA denied him permission to increase his stake-hold in Rangers further. Also in December, the Scottish Professional Football League added to Rangers financial woes by withholding £250,000 of broadcast money the club was due in a bid to recoup a fine imposed by the Nimmo Smith Commission.

The legal implications of the previous company that owned the club's liquidation featured prevalent in the news in July and November. In the summer, HM Revenue and Customs lost its appeal over the previous club's owners use of Employee Benefit Trusts but was granted leave to appeal a month later. Meanwhile, Rangers former chairman Craig Whyte was banned from being a company director for 15 years in September and a warrant was issued for his arrest a month later, he appeared in court facing charges under the Companies Act but was released on bail. Four men have appeared in court charged with fraudulent activity following a probe into the sale of Rangers in 2011. David Grier, Paul Clark and David Whitehouse (both administrators working for Duff & Phelps), and Gary Withey (a solicitor for Collyer Bristow) made no plea or declaration at Glasgow Sheriff Court and were granted bail. Meanwhile, the liquidators of Rangers former owners secured a £24m payment from Collyer Bristow, the lawyers who acted for Whyte when he bought the club.

On the football front, Rangers league campaign began with a defeat to newly demoted Hearts with the Edinburgh club scoring an extra minute winner. Despite embarking on a nine-game unbeaten run in all competitions, a loss at home to Hibernian left the side trailing Hearts by six-points at the top of the league by the end of September. Better news for Rangers was the reaching of the League Cup semi-final after a 1–0 win over St Johnstone, being drawn against Celtic which set up the first Old Firm derby in two years. Nevertheless, the club's title charge was effectively ended in November as the side lost a six-pointer match away to league leaders Hearts leaving them nine points behind. They did bounce back the following week in the Scottish Cup registering a 3–0 win over Scottish Premiership side Kilmarnock, however, in the club's third cup competition the team surrendered a 2–0 lead to lose 3–2 to fellow Championship team Alloa Athletic in the Challenge Cup. Even with the poor league form and exit in the Challenge Cup, there was no indication of significant pressure on manager Ally McCoist. The effect of the club's financial issues as underlined by the interim results that November, proved the catalyst for McCoist's departure as he became unhappy with the number of staff losing their jobs at Rangers. The situation became too much for McCoist and he tendered his resignation on 12 December which was later confirmed to the London Stock Exchange by the club three days later, with McCoist beginning a 12-month notice period. However, he was to serve less than a week of his notice period before being placed on gardening leave by the board, with his assistant manager Kenny McDowall being appointed interim manager until the end of the season.

The turn of the year saw Ashley's control over Rangers weakened as deals were made with a consortium led by Dave King, to purchase the shareholding of Laxey Partners which had stood at 16%. King took control of a 14.57% stake and two weeks later called for EGM on 16 January. The original date was set by the board was 4 March in a hotel in London, however, this was then moved to Ibrox Stadium after two successive hotels refused to host the event and the date was confirmed for 6 March. During the run up to the EGM, the incumbent Rangers board agreed £10m funding deal with Sports Direct. The agreement saw Sports Direct hold a floating charge over Rangers Training Centre, Edmiston House, the Albion Car Park and the club's registered trademarks. Sports Direct was also transferred 26% of Rangers' share in Rangers Retail Limited (Rangers previously held 51% with Sports Direct holding 49%). The club were bound to forego all shirt sponsorship revenue for the 2016-17 season and subsequent seasons until the loan is repaid. On transfer deadline day, Rangers also loaned five players from Newcastle United, a Premier League club that Ashley owned.

The month of February a large volume of share purchase and Rangers supporters groups are heavily involved. With the writing apparently on the wall, Rangers director James Easdale resigned just over a week before the EGM and chairman Somers departed with fours days to go. The SFA's investigation into Ashley concluded at the beginning of March with Ashley being deemed to have broken rules on dual ownership due to his influence on the affairs of Rangers, he was fined £7,500, and Rangers were subsequently fined £5,500 over a month later for their lack of governance. Just two days before the EGM, the club's Nominated adviser, WH Ireland, resigned resulting shares in the Plc being suspended. The outcome of the EGM was a decisive victory for King's consortium with Derek Llambias and finance director Barry Leach being voted off the board and King, Paul Murray and John Giligan moving in. Both King and Murray subsequently applied to be passed as a fit and proper person by the SFA with the later being cleared at the beginning of May. Further board appointments were made with John Bennett and Chris Graham added to the Plc board as non-executive directors and James Blair was appointed company secretary, however, Graham resigned his directorship only three days later. On the same day as the appointments Rangers suspended Llambias, Leach and Sandy Easdale from its football club board pending an internal investigation.

After poor results in both league and Scottish Cup, Stuart McCall replaced Kenny McDowall as interim manager. At the end of March it was revealed that Rangers five loan signings from Newcastle United were signed without medicals. On same day as interim accounts were published, 31 March, it emerged that Rangers would have owed Newcastle United £500,000 if they were promoted due to the agreement struck when loaning the players. It was announced on 2 April that Rangers would be de-listed from the AIM stock exchange after failing to find a Nominated adviser within the required period. The SPFL courted controversy with the final day fixtures by moving the Rangers v Hearts match from Saturday to Sunday, with the rest of the matches proceeding on the Saturday. This could have given Rangers a possible advantage in the chase for second place; however, the SPFL performed a U-turn with all matches being scheduled for early Saturday afternoon As it was, the team failed to be automatically promoted to the Premiership, drawing the final two league matches and finishing a disappointing third in the league. This meant the club faced at least six play-off matches in order to gain promotion. The ticket pricing of these matches attracted controversy. Following a precedent set by Hibernian the previous season, Rangers stated they would allow season ticket holders entry to home matches for free, however, this was rejected by the SPFL. Not to be deterred, Rangers then announced a blanket £5 ticket price offer for all seats. The side successfully negotiated two play-off rounds before crashing to a 6-1 aggregate defeat to Premiership team. The second leg of the play-off final ended in controversy as Rangers Bilel Mohsni and Motherwell's Lee Erwin brawled on the pitch after the match as Motherwell fans invade the pitch to goad the Rangers fans.

Meanwhile, the police probed the role of Mike Ashley and Sports Direct in the Rangers takeover and searched the companies headquarters. This was rumored to be the reason that Ashley demanded the repayment of his £5m loan to the club. Rangers set the date of the general meeting for June 2015 and added its own resolutions and proposals. On 19 May King was passed fit and proper by the SFA and became Chairman of the club on 22 May. On the same day King also loaned the club an additional £1.5m and a day later, Rangers legend John Greig was named honorary president of the club on 23 May.

Players

Squad information

Transfers

In

Total expenditure: £0m

Out

Total income: £1.054m

New contracts

Squad statistics

Top scorers

Last updated: 28 May 2015
Source: Match reports
Only competitive matches

Disciplinary record

Last updated: 31 May 2015
Source: Match reports
Only competitive matches

Awards

Club

Board of directors

Coaching staff

Other staff

Matches

Pre-season

Scottish Championship

Scottish Premiership Premiership play-offs

Challenge Cup

League Cup

Scottish Cup

Competitions

Overall

Scottish Championship

Standings

Results summary

Results by round

References 

2014-15
Scottish football clubs 2014–15 season